The 1960 British West Indies Championships was the fourth edition of the track and field competition between British colony nations in the Caribbean. It was held in Kingston, Jamaica. A total of 31 events were contested, twenty-two by men and nine by women. The women's programme was extended with three throwing events. A new men's event was also included: the athletics pentathlon was the first and only time that a combined track and field event was contested at the completion.

Jamaica's Anne Golding was the most successful athlete of the tournament, winning all three inaugural women's throwing events. Harry Prowell succeeded his fellow British Guianan, George de Peana, as the dominant long-distance runner by winning the 5000 m and 10,000 m races. Leroy Keane of Jamaica was the only other athlete to win two titles: he topped the podium in the 400 metres hurdles and also the pentathlon. Six men managed to retain their 1959 titles: Wilton Jackson (200 m), George Kerr (800 m), Ralph Gomes (a third 1500 m title), Keith Gardner (110 m hurdles), Moses Dwarika  (half marathon) and Sydney Thomas (3000 m walk). Brenda Archer was the only woman to defend her 1959 title, doing so in the women's high jump.

This competition preceded the assembly of the first British West Indies Olympic team. At the 1960 Summer Olympics, the federation won two medals: reigning British West Indies 800 m champion George Kerr took the bronze medal in his speciality, and a team of Kerr, James Wedderburn, Gardner and Mal Spence won a second bronze in the 4×400 metres relay.

Saint Lucia had its first ever medallist at the tournament in the form of Imbert Roberts's gold in the men's shot put.

Medal summary

Men

Women

References

Medallists
British West Indies Championships. GBR Athletics. Retrieved on 2015-03-21.

British West Indies Championships
British West Indies Championships
British West Indies Championships
British West Indies Championships
International athletics competitions hosted by Jamaica
Sport in Kingston, Jamaica